Achyra occidentalis is a moth in the family Crambidae. It was described by Packard in 1873. It is found in North America, where it has been recorded from Arizona, California and Nevada.

There are two forms, a dark and pale form. Adults of the dark form are on wing from March to April, while those of the pale form are on wing from June to August.

References

Moths described in 1873
Moths of North America
Pyraustinae
Taxa named by Alpheus Spring Packard